The Nobel Prizes and the Nobel Memorial Prize in Economic Sciences, which began in 1969, is a set of award based on Alfred Nobel's will given to "those who, during the preceding year, have conferred the greatest benefit to mankind." Since 1901, the prestigious Swedish Prize have been awarded 609 times to 975 people and 27 organizations. 

Up to date, there has only been one Brazilian citizen awarded a Nobel Prize – the biologist Peter Medawar who won the 1960 Nobel Prize in Physiology or Medicine with Australian virologist Frank Macfarlane Burnet. – despite numerous notable Brazilians have been nominated. There are noted Brazilians and Brazilian-based organizations who are members of laureate organizations such as the Brazilian Red Cross being part of the League of Red Cross Societies when it won the 1963 Nobel Peace Prize and the Brazilian scientists, Sérgio Trindade and Carlos Nobre, who were members of the International Panel on Climate Change (IPCC) when it was awarded in 2007.

Laureates

Members of laureate organizations
The following Brazilian-based organizations and individuals were significant members who contributed largely in making a larger organization become a Nobel laureate.

Nominations

Nominees
Since 1909, Brazilians have started to receive nominations for the prestigious Swedish prize in different categories. The following list are the nominees with verified nominations from the Nobel Committee and recognized international organizations. There are also other purported nominees whose nominations are yet to be verified since the archives are revealed 50 years after, among them:
 For Physics: Mário Schenberg (1914–1990), José Leite Lopes (1918–2006), Jayme Tiomno (1920–2011), Ennio Candotti (born 1942), and Carlos Bertulani (born 1955).
 For Chemistry: Otto Gottlieb, (1920–2011), Blanka Wladislaw (1917–2012), Ângelo da Cunha Pinto (1948–2015), and Elisa Orth (born 1984).
 For Physiology or Medicine: Maurício Rocha e Silva (1910–1983), Maria Carmela Lico (1927–1985), Aristides Leão (1914–1993), Euryclides de Jesus Zerbini (1912–1993), Nise da Silveira (1905–1999), Sérgio Henrique Ferreira (1934–2016), Ivo Pitanguy (1926–2016), Ruth Sonntag Nussenzweig (1928–2018), Ivan Izquierdo (1937–2021), José Eduardo Souza (1934–2022), Eduardo Krieger (born 1928), Miguel Nicolelis (born 1961), Celina Turchi (born 1952), Cesar Victora (born 1952)
 For Literature: Carolina Maria de Jesus (1914–1977), Clarice Lispector (1920–1977), Vinicius de Moraes (1913–1980), Cora Coralina (1889–1985), João Cabral de Melo Neto (1920–1999), Haroldo de Campos (1929–2003), Rachel de Queiroz (1910–2003), Hilda Hilst (1930–2004), Josué Montello (1917–2006), Moacyr Scliar (1937–2011), Rubem Fonseca (1925–2020), Nélida Piñon (1937–2022), Adélia Prado (born 1935), Ignacio de Loyola Brandão (born 1936), Marina Colasanti (born 1937), Marcia Theophilo (born 1941), Chico Buarque (born 1944), Paulo Coelho (born 1947), Milton Hatoum (born 1952), Bernardo Carvalho (born 1960), Daniel Munduruku (born 1964), Paulo Scott (born 1966), Adriana Lisboa (born 1970), and Jeferson Tenório (born 1977).
 For Peace: Marcolino Gomes Candau (1911–1983), Chico Mendes (1944–1988), José "Gentileza" Datrino (1917–1996), José Lutzenberger (1926–2002), Sérgio Vieira de Mello (1948–2003), Fernando Henrique Cardoso (born 1931), Chico Whitaker (born 1931), Erwin Kräutler, CPpS (born 1939), Frei Betto (born 1944), José Bustani (born 1945), Júlio Lancellotti (born 1948), Davi Kopenawa Yanomami (born 1956), Izabella Teixeira (born 1961), Sônia Guajajara (born 1974), and Claudelice Silva dos Santos (born 1982).
 For Economic Sciences: André Lara Resende (born 1951), Pérsio Arida (born 1952), Gustavo Franco (born 1956) and Ricardo Amorim (born 1971).

Nominators
The following list of Brazilian-based organizations and individuals became nominators of various candidates, local and international, for the Nobel Prize.

Notes

References

Lists of Nobel laureates by nationality